National Route 37 is a national highway in South Korea connects Geochang to Paju. It established on 14 March 1981.

Main stopovers

South Gyeongsang Province
 Geochang
North Jeolla Province
 Muju
South Chungcheong Province
 Geumsan
North Chungcheong Province
 Okcheon - Boeun
North Gyeongsang Province
 Sangju
North Chungcheong Province
 Goesan - Eumseong
Gyeonggi Province
 Icheon - Yeoju - Yangpyeong - Gapyeong - Pocheon - Yeoncheon - Paju

Major intersections 

 (■): Expressway 
IS: Intersection, IC: Interchange

South Gyeongsang Province

North Jeolla Province

South Chungcheong Province

North Chungcheong Province (South Sangju)

North Gyeongsang Province

North Chungcheong Province (North Sangju)

Gyeonggi Province 

  Expressway

References

37
Roads in South Gyeongsang
Roads in North Jeolla
Roads in South Chungcheong
Roads in North Chungcheong
Roads in North Gyeongsang
Roads in Gyeonggi